Lee D. Qualm (born February 23, 1954) is an American politician who served as a member of the South Dakota House of Representatives from January 11, 2013 to January 12, 2021.

Elections
2012 When District 21 incumbent Republican Representative James Schaefer redistricted to District 26, Qualm and appointed Representative David Scott ran unopposed for the June 5, 2012 Republican Primary; in the four-way November 6, 2012 General election, former Democratic Senator Julie Bartling took the first seat and Qualm took the second seat with 4,421 votes (27.07%) ahead of Representative Scott and Democratic nominee Gary Coleman.
2010 When District 21 incumbent Republican Representatives Thomas Deadrick was term limited and retired and left a District 21 seat open, Qualm ran in the three-way June 8, 2010 Republican Primary but lost to incumbent Representative Kent Juhnke and James Schaefer, who went on to win the four-way November 2, 2010 General election against Democratic nominees David Reis (a perennial candidate who had sought legislative seats in 2002, 2004, 2006, and 2008) and Norm Cihak.

References

External links
Official page at the South Dakota Legislature
Campaign site
 

1954 births
21st-century American politicians
Living people
Republican Party members of the South Dakota House of Representatives
People from Platte, South Dakota